The Church of Jesus Christ of Latter-day Saints in Puerto Rico refers to the Church of Jesus Christ of Latter-day Saints (LDS Church) and its members in Puerto Rico. The first branch (small congregation) was formed in 1950. As of December 31, 2021, there were 23,473 members in 38 congregations in Puerto Rico.

History

Stakes
As of February 2023, Puerto Rico had the following stakes:

Missions
Current Mission
Puerto Rico San Juan Mission
When LDS Church missionaries first arrived in Puerto Rico in 1963, the island was part of the Florida Ft Lauderdale Mission. On July 7, 1979, the Puerto Rico San Juan Mission was organized.

Lesser Antilles North District
The Puerto Rico San Juan Mission currently covers all stakes in Puerto Rico as well as the Lesser Antilles North District which was Created January 24, 2021. This district includes the following six branches: the Portsmouth, St Croix, St John's, St Kitts, St Thomas, and Tortola Branches. The district covers the nations and territories of Antigua and Barbuda, the British Virgin Islands, Dominica, Montserrat, St Kitts and Nevis, and the United States Virgin Islands.

Temples

Groundbreaking for the San Juan Puerto Rico Temple was on May 4, 2019, by Walter F. González.

See also

Religion in Puerto Rico

References

External links
 History of the Church in Puerto Rico David R. Crockett
 Chronology of the Church in Puerto Rico Gardner Russell
 Early Convert in Puerto Rico Virgil L. Doan
 First Branches organized in Puerto Rico Nile A. Sorenson
 A Pioneer Family in Puerto Rico Jeri James
 The Cortese Family in Puerto Rico Frank Cortese
 Hurricane Hugo hits Puerto Rico Sandra Fee
 Missionary Experience Joseph R. Goodman
 A Youth Pioneer in Puerto Rico Gregory R. Dalton
 Purse Snatcher in Puerto Rico F. Burton Howard
 The Church of Jesus Christ of Latter-day Saints (Caribbean) - Official Site
 The Church of Jesus Christ of Latter-day Saints - Puerto Rico Newsroom (Spanish)
 ComeUntoChrist.org Latter-day Saints Visitor site
 Facts and Statistics - Puerto Rico

Lesser Antilles North District
 Facts and Statistics - Antigua and Barbuda
 Facts and Statistics - Dominica
 Facts and Statistics - Saint Kitts and Nevis

Puerto Rico
Christian denominations in Puerto Rico